The 2007–08 Milwaukee Bucks season was the 40th season of NBA basketball in Milwaukee, Wisconsin.  It began in October. The Bucks finished with just 26 wins in the weak Eastern Conference and as a result Larry Krystkowiak was fired after just one season as coach, one day after the season officially ended. Scott Skiles was then appointed coach soon after to a four-year contract.

Key dates prior to the start of the season:
 The 2007 NBA draft took place in New York City on June 28.
 The free agency period begins in July.

Draft picks
Milwaukee's selections from the 2007 NBA draft in New York City.

Roster

Regular season

Season standings

Record vs. opponents

Game log 

|-style="background:#fcc;"
| 1 || October 31, 2007 || @ Orlando
| L 83–102
|Michael Redd (25)
|Andrew Bogut (11)
|Andrew Bogut, Charlie Bell (4)
| Amway Arena17,519
| 0–1

|-style="background:#fcc;"
| 2 || November 2, 2007 || @ Charlotte
| L 99–102
|Michael Redd (21)
|Andrew Bogut (17)
|Charlie Bell (5)
| Charlotte Bobcats Arena16,368
| 0–2
|-style="background:#bbffbb;"
| 3 || November 3, 2007 || Chicago
| W 78–72
|Michael Redd (27)
|Michael Redd (9)
|Michael Redd (5)
| Bradley Center18,717
| 1–2
|-style="background:#bbffbb;"
| 4 || November 6, 2007 || Toronto
| W 112–85
|Desmond Mason (21)
|Andrew Bogut (11)
|Michael Redd, Mo Williams (6)
| Bradley Center13,549
| 2–2
|-style="background:#fcc;"
| 5 || November 9, 2007 || @ Houston
| L 88–104
|Michael Redd (26)
|Mo Williams (9)
|Mo Williams, Yi Jianlian (9)
| Toyota Center18,244
| 2–3
|-style="background:#fcc;"
| 6 || November 11, 2007 || @ San Antonio
| L 88–113
|Mo Williams (17)
|Yi Jianlian, Jake Voskuhl (7)
|Mo Williams (6)
| AT&T Center17,670
| 2–4
|-style="background:#bbffbb;"
| 7 || November 14, 2007 || Memphis
| W 102–99
|Michael Redd (31)
|Yi Jianlian (12)
|
| Bradley Center13,462
| 3–4
|-style="background:#bbffbb;"
| 8 || November 17, 2007 || Atlanta
| W 105–96
|Andrew Bogut, Michael Redd (21)
|
|
| Bradley Center14,511
| 4–4
|-style="background:#bbffbb;"
| 9 || November 20, 2007 || @ Cleveland
| W 111–107
|Michael Redd (34)
|
|
| Quicken Loans Arena20,115
| 5–4
|-style="background:#bbffbb;"
| 10 || November 21, 2007 || Los Angeles
| W 110–103
|Michael Redd (26)
|
|
| Bradley Center17,526
| 6–4
|-style="background:#bbffbb;"
| 11 || November 24, 2007 || Dallas
| W 97–95
|Michael Redd (27)
|
|
| Bradley Center16,376
| 7–4
|-style="background:#fcc;"
| 12 || November 27, 2007 || Philadelphia
| L 99–114
|Michael Redd (17)
|
|
| Bradley Center18,717
| 7–5
|-style="background:#fcc;"
| 13 || November 28, 2007 || @ Atlanta
| L 80–96
|Michael Redd (24)
|
|
| Philips Arena11,286
| 7–6
|-style="background:#fcc;"
| 14 || November 30, 2007 || @ New York
| L 88–91
|Michael Redd (27)
|
|
| Madison Square Garden18,979
| 7–7

|-style="background:#fcc;"
| 15 || December 1, 2007 || Detroit
| L 91–117
|Bobby Simmons, Charlie Villanueva (13)
|
|
| Bradley Center17,326
| 7–8
|-style="background:#bbffbb;"
| 16 || December 4, 2007 || @ L. A. Clippers
| W 87–78
|Michael Redd (25)
|
|
| STAPLES Center16,004
| 8–8
|-style="background:#fcc;"
| 17 || December 5, 2007 || @ Golden State
| L 90–120
|Michael Redd (24)
|
|
| Oracle Arena17,823
| 8–9
|-style="background:#fcc;"
| 18 || December 7, 2007 || @ Seattle
| L 98–104
|Michael Redd (41)
|
|
| KeyArena13,142
| 8–10
|-style="background:#fcc;"
| 19 || December 9, 2007 || @ Portland
| L 113–117 OT
|Mo Williams (33)
|
|
| Rose Garden18,317
| 8–11
|-style="background:#fcc;"
| 20 || December 10, 2007 || @ Sacramento
| L 93–96
|Michael Redd (24)
|
|
| ARCO Arena12,449
| 8–12
|-style="background:#bbffbb;"
| 21 || December 12, 2007 || Orlando
| W 100–86
|Michael Redd (27)
|
|
| Bradley Center14,617
| 9–12
|-style="background:#fcc;"
| 22 || December 14, 2007 || @ Boston
| L 82–104
|Mo Williams (14)
|
|
| TD Banknorth Garden18,624
| 9–13
|-style="background:#bbffbb;"
| 23 || December 15, 2007 || Minnesota
| W 95–92
|Michael Redd (32)
|Andrew Bogut (13)
|
| Bradley Center15,512
| 10–13
|-style="background:#fcc;"
| 24 || December 17, 2007 || @ Cleveland
| L 99–104 2OT
|Michael Redd (22)
|
|
| Quicken Loans Arena20,562
| 10–14
|-style="background:#fcc;"
| 25 || December 19, 2007 || Sacramento
| L 89–102
|Michael Redd (27)
|Yi Jianlian (12)
|
| Bradley Center13,746
| 10–15
|-style="background:#bbffbb;"
| 26 || December 22, 2007 || Charlotte
| W 103–99
|Yi Jianlian (29)
|
|
| Bradley Center15,796
| 11–15
|-style="background:#fcc;"
| 27 || December 26, 2007 || @ Denver
| L 105–125
|Mo Williams (28)
|
|
| Pepsi Center18,701
| 11–16
|-style="background:#fcc;"
| 28 || December 28, 2007 || @ Chicago
| L 99–103
|Michael Redd (34)
|
|
| United Center22,189
| 11–17
|-style="background:#fcc;"
| 29 || December 29, 2007 || New Jersey
| L 95–97
|Michael Redd (35)
|
|
| Bradley Center15,562
| 11–18
|-style="background:#fcc;"
| 30 || December 31, 2007 || @ Detroit
| L 69–114
|Michael Redd (18)
|
|
| The Palace of Auburn Hills22,076
| 11–19

|-style="background:#bbffbb;"
| 31 || January 2, 2008 || @ Miami
| W 103–98
|Mo Williams (25)
|
|
| AmericanAirlines Arena19,600
| 12–19
|-style="background:#fcc;"
| 32 || January 4, 2008 || Washington
| L 77–101
|Charlie Villanueva (20)
|
|
| Bradley Center16,250
| 12–20
|-style="background:#bbffbb;"
| 33 || January 6, 2008 || @ Charlotte
| W 93–89
|Charlie Bell (27)
|
|
| Charlotte Bobcats Arena10,884
| 13–20
|-style="background:#bbffbb;"
| 34 || January 8, 2008 || @ Philadelphia
| W 87–83
|Charlie Bell, Mo Williams (21)
|
|
| Wachovia Center10,045
| 14–20
|-style="background:#bbffbb;"
| 35 || January 9, 2008 || Miami
| W 98–92
|Mo Williams (35)
|
|
| Bradley Center15,834
| 15–20
|-style="background:#fcc;"
| 36 || January 11, 2008 || @ L. A. Lakers
| L 105–110
|Mo Williams (28)
|
|
| STAPLES Center18,997
| 15–21
|-style="background:#fcc;"
| 37 || January 12, 2008 || @ Phoenix
| L 114–120
|Andrew Bogut (29)
|
|
| US Airways Center18,422
| 15–22
|-style="background:#fcc;"
| 38 || January 14, 2008 || @ Utah
| L 87–98
|Andrew Bogut (23)
|
|
| EnergySolutions Arena19,911
| 15–23
|-style="background:#bbffbb;"
| 39 || January 16, 2008 || Atlanta
| W 87–80
|Andrew Bogut (21)
|
|
| Bradley Center14,506
| 16–23
|-style="background:#fcc;"
| 40 || January 19, 2008 || Golden State
| L 99–119
|Michael Redd (24)
|
|
| Bradley Center16,615
| 16–24
|-style="background:#fcc;"
| 41 || January 21, 2008 || @ New Orleans
| L 92–106
|Michael Redd (19)
|
|
| New Orleans Arena11,663
| 16–25
|-style="background:#fcc;"
| 42 || January 22, 2008 || Phoenix
| L 105–114
|Michael Redd (28)
|
|
| Bradley Center14,503
| 16–26
|-style="background:#bbffbb;"
| 43 || January 24, 2008 || Indiana
| W 104–92
|Michael Redd (37)
|
|
| Bradley Center14,267
| 17–26
|-style="background:#fcc;"
| 44 || January 25, 2008 || @ Toronto
| L 75–106
|Michael Redd, Charlie Villanueva (12)
|
|
| Air Canada Centre19,800
| 17–27
|-style="background:#bbffbb;"
| 45 || January 27, 2008 || Indiana
| W 105–102 OT
|Mo Williams (37)
|
|
| Bradley Center15,621
| 18–27
|-style="background:#fcc;"
| 46 || January 29, 2008 || @ New Jersey
| L 80–87
|Royal Ivey (19)
|
|
| Izod Center14,133
| 18–28
|-style="background:#fcc;"
| 47 || January 30, 2008 || @ Philadelphia
| L 69–112
|Royal Ivey (19)
|
|
| Wachovia Center12,507
| 18–29

|-style="background:#fcc;"
| 48 || February 2, 2008 || Houston
| L 83–91
|Andrew Bogut (21)
|Yi Jianlian (7)
|Mo Williams (9)
| Bradley Center18,717
| 18–30
|-style="background:#bbffbb;"
| 49 || February 5, 2008 || @ Memphis
| W 102–97
|Mo Williams (32)
|
|
| FedEx Forum10,749
| 19–30
|-style="background:#fcc;"
| 50 || February 6, 2008 || @ Dallas
| L 96–107
|Mo Williams (36)
|
|
| American Airlines Center20,079
| 19–31
|-style="background:#fcc;"
| 51 || February 9, 2008 || New York
| L 98–99
|Michael Redd, Charlie Villanueva (21)
|
|
| Bradley Center15,874
| 19–32
|-style="background:#fcc;"
| 52 || February 11, 2008 || L. A. Clippers
| L 89–96
|Mo Williams (31)
|
|
| Bradley Center13,319
| 19–33
|-style="background:#fcc;"
| 53 || February 13, 2008 || New Orleans
| L 107–111
|Michael Redd (30)
|
|
| Bradley Center14,317
| 19–34
|-style="background:#bbffbb;"
| 54 || February 20, 2008 || Detroit
| W 103–98
|Michael Redd (27)
|
|
| Bradley Center14,211
| 20–34
|-style="background:#fcc;"
| 55 || February 22, 2008 || @ Detroit
| L 100–127
|Michael Redd, Charlie Villanueva (18)
|
|
| The Palace of Auburn Hills22,076
| 20–35
|-style="background:#bbffbb;"
| 56 || February 23, 2008 || Denver
| W 115–109
|Michael Redd (42)
|
|
| Bradley Center16,674
| 21–35
|-style="background:#bbffbb;"
| 57 || February 26, 2008 || Cleveland
| W 105–102
|Mo Williams (37)
|
|
| Bradley Center16,674
| 22–35
|-style="background:#fcc;"
| 58 || February 28, 2008 || @ New Jersey
| L 106–120
|Michael Redd (42)
|
|
| Izod Center14,034
| 22–36

|-style="background:#fcc;"
| 59 || March 1, 2008 || San Antonio
| L 94–96
|Michael Redd (25)
|
|
| Bradley Center16,974
| 22–37
|-style="background:#fcc;"
| 60 || March 2, 2008 || @ Indiana
| L 106–128
|Michael Redd (42)
|
|
| Conseco Fieldhouse11,614
| 22–38
|-style="background:#bbffbb;"
| 61 || March 5, 2008 || Seattle
| W 118–106
|Charlie Villanueva (32)
|
|
| Bradley Center15,010
| 23–38
|-style="background:#fcc;"
| 62 || March 7, 2008 || Portland
| L 101–103
|Michael Redd (25)
|
|
| Bradley Center15,537
| 23–39
|-style="background:#fcc;"
| 63 || March 9, 2008 || Philadelphia
| L 97–119
|Charlie Villanueva (25)
|
|
| Bradley Center16,437
| 23–40
|-style="background:#fcc;"
| 64 || March 11, 2008 || @ Washington
| L 97–105
|Michael Redd (26)
|
|
| Verizon Center14,755
| 23–41
|-style="background:#fcc;"
| 65 || March 12, 2008 || Utah
| L 110–114
|Michael Redd, Charlie Villanueva (26)
|
|
| Bradley Center14,582
| 23–42
|-style="background:#fcc;"
| 66 || March 15, 2008 || Boston
| L 77–99
|Charlie Bell (16)
|
|
| Bradley Center14,582
| 23–43

March 
Record: 2–12; Home: 2–7; Road: 0–5

April 
Record: 2–8; Home: 1–4; Road: 1–4

 Green background indicates win.
 Red background indicates loss.

Player stats

Regular season

Awards and records

Records

Milestones

Transactions
The Bucks have been involved in the following transactions during the 2007–08 season.

Trades

Free agents

See also
 2007–08 NBA season

References

Milwaukee Bucks seasons
2007–08 NBA season by team
Milwaukee Bucks
Milwaukee Bucks